The Memphis Blues Tour is the eleventh concert tour by American recording artist Cyndi Lauper, in support of her eleventh studio album. The tour visited the Americas, Asia, Australia and Europe. During the trek, Lauper performed at numerous jazz festivals including the New Orleans Jazz & Heritage Festival, Jazz à Vienne and Jazz Fest Wien. In the fall of 2011, Lauper continued the tour as a co-headlining show  with Dr. John titled From Memphis to Mardi Gras.  Lauper performed over a hundred concerts beginning in June 2010 and ending in November 2011.

Background
Lauper announced the tour in April 2010 via her official website. The singer stated the show will focus heavily on the blues sound of her album alongside her past hits. The tour was designed to be an intimate tour. mimicking the jazz culture of the 1920s. Lauper wanted the show to emulate hearing good music in a "smoky cafe". While on tour, concertgoers were able to donate to charities supported by the singer including the Give a Damn Foundation. Lauper was joined on tour by Charlie Musselwhite and Allen Toussaint, who helped contribute to the making of her recent album. While on tour in Japan, Lauper concerts occurred during the 2011 Tōhoku earthquake. Although the singer was urged to leave the island, Lauper stayed and continued to perform her shows as scheduled. She donated the funds from her shows to help relief efforts. In Argentina, Lauper gave an impromptu performance of her hit "Girls Just Want to Have Fun" at the Aeroparque Jorge Newbery.

Opening acts
David Rhodes (North America—Leg 1, select dates)
Charlie Musselwhite (North America—Leg 1, select dates)
Sharon Jones & The Dap-Kings (Atlanta—August 2010)
Allen Toussaint (Los Angeles—August 2010)
The Ferocious Few (North America—Leg 2, select dates)
Lan Lan (Brazil)
Casey Donovan (Australia, select dates)
Rainy Boy Sleep (England, Scotland)
NEeMA (Istres)

Setlist
{{hidden
| headercss = background: #ccccff; font-size: 100%; width: 59%;
| contentcss = text-align: left; font-size: 100%; width: 75%;
| header = North America—Leg 1 & 2
| content =
"Just Your Fool"
"Shattered Dreams"
"Early in the Mornin'"
"Romance in the Dark"
"How Blue Can You Get"
"Down Don't Bother Me"
"Down So Low"
"Cross Road Blues"
"Rollin' and Tumblin'"
"Don't Cry No More" (contains excerpts from "Shout")
"Lead Me On"(Second Leg only)
"Who Let In The Rain"
"Change of Heart"
"Girls Just Want to Have Fun"
"Time After Time"
Encore
"True Colors" (contains excerpts from "Power to the People")
Notes
"She Bop" and "Mother Earth" were performed at select dates during the first and second North American leg.
"Hound Dog" was performed during the second North American leg.
During concerts in December, Lauper performed "I Saw Three Ships", "Feels Like Christmas", "Minnie and Santa", "Silent Night" and "In the Bleak Midwinter".
During the concert at the Mayo Center for the Performing Arts, Lauper performed "I'm Gonna Be Strong", "I Don't Want to Cry", and "Wild Women Don't Have the Blues".
During the concert at the Keswick Theatre (2010), Lauper performed "Sally's Pigeons" and "Above the Clouds".
During the concert at the Tropicana Showroom, Lauper performed "Shine".
}}
{{hidden
| headercss = background: #ccccff; font-size: 100%; width: 59%;
| contentcss = text-align: left; font-size: 100%; width: 75%;
| header = South America/Asia/Australia
| content =
"Just Your Fool"
"Shattered Dreams"
"She Bop"
"Early in the Mornin'"
"All Through the Night"
"Lead Me On"
"Cross Road Blues"
"Down Don't Bother Me"
"Don't Cry No More" (contains excerpts from "Shout")
"The Goonies 'R' Good Enough"
"Change of Heart"
"Girls Just Want to Have Fun"
"Time After Time"
"Shine"
"Mother Earth"
Encore
"True Colors" (contains excerpts from "Power to the People")
Notes,
"Iko Iko" was performed at select dates during the South American leg.
In Rio, Lauper performed "Sally's Pigeon".
During the performances in São Paulo, Lauper performed "Fearless".
In Porto Alegre, Lauper performed "Edge of the Earth". During the same show Lauper performed "Rain on Me"
In Cuiabá, Lauper performed "Fearless". The song was also included during the performance at the Teatro Gran Rex.
In Buenos Aires, Lauper performed "Boy Blue".
In Santiago, Lauper performed "Rain on Me".
During the concerts at Orchard Hall, Tokyo, Lauper performed "I Don't Want to Cry".
During the March 21 concert in Osaka, Lauper performed "What's Going On".
During the March 22 concert in Osaka, Lauper performed "Fearless".
"How Blue Can You Get" was performed during all Australian concerts.
During the concerts in Brisbane and Perth, Lauper performed "Sally's Pigeon". 
During the March 31 concert in Sydney, Lauper performed "Rain on Me".
During the concert in Newcastle, Lauper performed "I'm Gonna Be Strong". The song was also included in the performance at the Palais Theatre.
During the concert in Melbourne, Lauper performed "Heading West" in lieu of "Shine". During the same show, Lauper included "Who Let In The Rain".
}}
{{hidden
| headercss = background: #ccccff; font-size: 100%; width: 59%;
| contentcss = text-align: left; font-size: 100%; width: 75%;
| header = Europe
| content =
"Just Your Fool"
"Shattered Dreams"
"She Bop"
"Early in the Mornin'"
"Cross Road Blues"
"All Through the Night"
"Down So Low"
"Down Don't Bother Me"
"Don't Cry No More" (contains excerpts from "Shout")
"The Goonies 'R' Good Enough"
"Change of Heart"
"What's Going On"
"Lyfe"
"Girls Just Want to Have Fun"
"Time After Time" (contains excerpts from "The World Is Stone")
Encore
"True Colors"
Notes
"Lead Me On" was often performed in lieu of "Down So Low".
"The Goonies 'R' Good Enough" was not included during the performances at the Harpa Concert Hall, Stora Salongen, and Vognsbølparken.
"Fearless" was performed in lieu of "The World Is Stone" during concerts at the Harpa Concert Hall, Symphony Hall and the Colston Hall.
"Don't Cry No More" was included in the performances at L'Olympia and the Kaufleuten.
During the concert at the Harpa Concert Hall, Lauper performed "Mother Earth".
During the concert at the Stora Salongen, Lauper performed "How Blue Can You Get". The song was also included during the performances at the Vognsbølparken, Bridgewater Hall, Glasgow Royal Concert Hall and the Sheffield City Hall.
During the concert at the Stora Salongen, Lauper performed "Sally's Pigeon". The song was also included during the performances at the Kaufleuten, Arena Civica, Laeiszhalle and the Admiralspalast.
During the concert at Glasgow Royal Concert Hall, Lauper performed "Wild Mountain Thyme" in lieu of "The World Is Stone".
During the concert at the Brighton Dome Concert Hall, Lauper performed "Kindred Spirit".
During the concert at the HMV Hammersmith Apollo, Lauper performed "Carey". During the same concert, Lauper performed "Mother Earth".
During the concert at the Plaça del Mercat, Lauper performed "Down So Low". The song was also included during the performance at the Trinidad Square.
During the concert at City Hall, Lauper performed "Who Let In The Rain".
}}
{{hidden
| headercss = background: #ccccff; font-size: 100%; width: 59%;
| contentcss = text-align: left; font-size: 100%; width: 75%;
| header = North America—Leg 3 
| content = From Memphis to Mardi Gras Tour (with Dr. John)
"Just Your Fool"
"Shattered Dreams"
"She Bop"
"Crossroads"
"All Through The Night"
"Lead Me On"
"Don't Cry No More"
"The Goonies 'R' Good Enough"
"Change Of Heart"
"What's Going On"
"Lyfe"
"Girls Just Want To Have Fun"
"Time After Time"
Encore
"True Colors"
Notes
"Down So Low" was performed in place of "Lead Me On" on night where Charlie Musslewhite was present
"Down Don't Bother Me" was performed on a few select dates
"Whats Going On" and "Lyfe" were not always performed due to curfew restrictions
Beginning in Red Bank, New Jersey, Cyndi performed a duet with Dr. John during his set. These songs varied between "Makin Whoopee", "Wang Dang Doodle" and "Glory Glory Hallelujah!"
On certain nights, special a cappella songs were performed like "Fearless", "Sallys Pigeons" and "Hat Full Of Stars"
}}

Tour dates

Festivals and other miscellaneous performances

Cancellations and rescheduled shows

Box office score data

Broadcasts and recordings
Lauper's performance during Jazz á Vienne was broadcast on live on French radio station France Inter. The show omitted "All Through the Night", with "Cross Road Blues" and "Down So Low" not broadcast in full.

A DVD/ CD of her performance on December 2, 2010 at The Warehouse in Memphis, Tennessee was released in October 2011 and was titled "Cyndi Lauper To Memphis, with Love."  It was a unique film with documentary footage but included the performances of the entire set list of the show that night.  The package includes a booklet that looked like a concert program with photos from the Memphis show in particular but also photos of Cyndi and her band in various places on the Memphis Blues tour.

Critical reception
The tour was praised by music critics and concertgoers. Katherine Feeny (Brisbane Times) gave the pop singer's concert at the QPAC Concert Hall four out of five stars. She says, "It's just one of example of her ability to endear herself to the room, an ability testament to her skill and experience. So too is Lauper's lack of need for showy stage and lighting. The sheer scale and gutsy thrust of her vocal range coupled with a dynamic presence more than fills the stage". Michael Dwyer (The Sydney Morning Herald) gave the singer three and a half out of five stars. He writes, "Maybe the subtleties between thought and expression are redundant when a Broadway dynamo in a leather pantsuit is prowling the theatre, standing on chairs and bellowing that 'Girls Just Wanna Have Fun'. But when she hit the right blend of power and soul—such as with Robert Johnson's Cross Roads Blues—Lauper channelled something more profound".

The praise for the tour continued as Lauper began to perform in England. Kate Watkins (City Life) gave the performance at the Bridgewater Hall four out of five stars. She explains, "The night ended with a sombre performance of 'True Colors' which showcased the depth and feeling of her vocals which have only improved since she started singing the Blues". Catherine Meek (The Argus) gave the concert at the Brighton Dome Concert Hall a positive review. She states, "Whether she was singing a track from her most recent album, 'Memphis Blues', with full backing, or a solo of an old favourite with nothing but the microphone and her dulcimer, Lauper's voice bellowed harmony".

Personnel
Band
Orris Warner – drums
Michael Toles – guitar
William Wittman – bass guitar
Archie Turner – keyboards
Stephen Gaboury, Sr. – piano
Kay Hanley, Tara Stone – backing vocals

External links
Lauper's Official Website

References

2010 concert tours
2011 concert tours
Cyndi Lauper concert tours